Joseph Joshua Williams (4 June 1902 – 1978) was an English footballer. Williams featured for clubs Arsenal, Carlisle United, Huddersfield Town, Middlesbrough, Rotherham County and Stoke City in his playing career.

Career
Williams was an outside forward who started out with his hometown club Rotherham County, for whom he played over a hundred games. In the summer of 1924 he was signed by Huddersfield Town. At Huddersfield he won two First Division titles in 1924–25 and 1925–26. During the 1925–26 season he played 23 league games for Huddersfield. Williams then moved to Stoke City in March 1926, of whom were relegated from the Second Division. He helped Stoke gain an instant return to the Second Division winning the Third Division North in 1926–27 as he scored six goals in 31 appearances. Williams thus became the first player to be relegated and win a League Championship medal in the same season. He was capped 20 times in 1927–28 as Stoke finished fifth. He then scored a career best of seven goals in the following season.

In the summer of 1929, he toured South Africa with an FA XI, earning two caps. On his return to England in September 1929 he moved to Arsenal, being signed by his former boss at Huddersfield Herbert Chapman. Williams made his Arsenal debut in a 5–2 defeat at Aston Villa on 25 September 1929. The following month he played in the 1929 FA Charity Shield, for the Professionals against the Amateurs at The Den, which the Professionals won 3–0.

Williams played sixteen times in the 1929–30 season, and helped Arsenal on their run to the 1930 FA Cup Final. He was unfortunately injured in a match against Newcastle United at the start of April 1930 and consequently missed the cup final. Returning the following season, he made only nine appearances. These came as an understudy to Joe Hulme and Cliff Bastin who had established themselves as first-choice wingers, and he thus missed out on a third Championship medal. Williams made one more appearance for Arsenal before leaving in March 1932; in total he played 26 games for Arsenal, scoring five goals.

Williams then joined up with Middlesbrough who he played with for another four seasons. He then ended his playing days at Carlisle United in the 1935–36 season.

Career statistics
Source:

Honours
 Huddersfield Town
 Football League First Division: 1924–25, 1925–26

 Stoke City
 Football League Third Division North: 1926–27

 Arsenal
 Football League First Division: 1930–31

References
 Specific

 General
 
 

1902 births
1978 deaths
English footballers
Footballers from Rotherham
Association football wingers
English Football League players
Rotherham County F.C. players
Huddersfield Town A.F.C. players
Stoke City F.C. players
Arsenal F.C. players
Middlesbrough F.C. players
Carlisle United F.C. players